Cash Carraway is a British-Irish author, playwright and screenwriter, best known for creating and writing the HBO TV series, Rain Dogs. Carraway first came to prominence for her bestselling book Skint Estate. Her writing is often compared to Hubert Selby Jr. and Charles Bukowski.

Time magazine described Carraway's writing style as "Raunchy gallows humour. And she's genius at it."

Early life 
Cash Carraway was born in Camberwell, London, on 6 January 1981, and raised in South East London by her Irish Gaelic speaking grandmother (originally from Carraroe, Connemara, County Galway) Carraway attended various comprehensive schools including Carshalton High School for Girls before training as an actor at The BRIT school. As a teenager she worked in a Soho clip joint.

Career

Rain Dogs
In March 2022, the BBC announced that production had begun on Carraway's original comedy drama series Rain Dogs. As the creator, writer and executive producer of Rain Dogs, Carraway serves as showrunner on the HBO original starring Daisy May Cooper.

In an interview with Warner Media, Carraway said "Rain Dogs isn't Skint Estate, it isn't autobiographical but it definitely has firm roots in the chip on my shoulder."

In March 2023, Carraway told the Hollywood Reporter "There's a lot of me in Rain Dogs but it's not my life story. I'm not Costello Jones, if anything I'm more like Selby, I've just hidden myself inside an upper class gay man."

Carraway was originally going to call the series All Shook Down after an album by The Replacements.

Skint Estate
In 2019 Penguin Books published Carraway's memoir Skint Estate. The book was met with critical acclaim and The Times called her "The new voice of a generation."

The film and television rights to Skint Estate were sold in a bidding war and the project went into formal development with the BBC.

Carraway began work on the screenplay before quitting the project, stating it was "too exposing." She later told the Hollywood Reporter "I don't dislike Skint Estate but I disliked the fact that writing about myself was the only way I was allowed to make money from writing. I never wanted to tell my story, so I quit. I don't want my life on telly."

A prequel to Skint Estate entitled Fleshpot was announced by Ebury Publishing in 2020.

Film 
Carraway wrote and directed the BBC film L'Opera del Lavoratore starring Neil Maskell which premiered at the 2022 Glasgow Film Festival.

Theatre 
Before becoming a writer Carraway trained as an actor. In 2001, she started writing and performing sketch comedy which led to Soho Theatre commissioning her first play The Last Peepshow in Soho.

Published works

Plays
 The Last Peepshow in Soho (Soho Theatre)
 The French Inhaler (Clean Break)
 Refuge Woman (Battersea Arts Centre)

Books
 Skint Estate: Notes from the Poverty Line (2019; Penguin Random House)
 La Porca Miseria (2023; Alegre)

TV
 L'Opera del Lavoratore (BBC) – writer, director; short film
 Rain Dogs (BBC/HBO) – creator, writer, executive producer

References

External links
 Carraway's official website
 Carraway on IMDb

21st-century Irish women writers
Irish women dramatists and playwrights
Irish women memoirists
Irish women screenwriters
1981 births
Living people